Suffragette is a 2015 British historical drama film about women's suffrage in the United Kingdom, directed by Sarah Gavron and written by Abi Morgan. The film stars Carey Mulligan, Helena Bonham Carter, Brendan Gleeson, Anne-Marie Duff, Ben Whishaw, and Meryl Streep.

Filming began on 24 February 2014. It is the first feature film to be shot in the Houses of Parliament. The film was released in the United Kingdom on 12 October 2015 by the French film company Pathé through its British distributor 20th Century Fox. Originally scheduled to be released by Relativity Media, the film was ultimately released in a limited release in North America on 23 October 2015 by Focus Features.

Plot
In 1912, Maud Watts is a 24-year-old laundry worker. While delivering a package, she is caught up in a suffragette protest which includes her workmate, Violet Miller.

Alice Haughton, the wife of an MP, encourages women from the laundry to testify to a Parliamentary committee. Violet offers but is beaten by her abusive husband and Maud testifies. The women later learn, at a public announcement, that the vote is not to be extended. Maud is caught up in the protest, arrested, and jailed for a week. While in jail, she meets Emily Davison, a confidante of Emmeline Pankhurst.

Maud faces stigma from neighbours and workmates. She tells her husband Sonny that she will stay away from the suffragettes but attends a secret rally to hear Pankhurst speak. She has a brief exchange with Pankhurst. Again detained, she is taken home by police. This time, her husband throws her out. Maud struggles to see her son, continuing to work until her picture is published as a known suffragette. Maud is then sacked and, past breaking point, she burns the hand of her male supervisor, who has been sexually abusing girls in the laundry for years, including Maud when she was younger, and Maggie, Violet's daughter. The police are called, and Inspector Steed allows Maud to leave, offering her an opportunity to act as an informer. Maud refuses.

Sonny continues to prevent Maud from seeing their son, George. This prompts Maud into more radicalism in favour of women's rights. She learns that Sonny has offered George for adoption. Maud becomes more radical and is involved in bombing pillar boxes and cutting telegraph wires. She and her comrades are imprisoned after they blow up an empty Parliamentary residence. In prison, Maud goes on hunger strike and is subjected to brutal force-feeding.

The suffragettes feel that they must do still more to gain attention. They decide to attend the Derby when King George V will be in attendance, planning to step in front of the cameras and unfurl their banners. Before they go, Emily Davison hands Maud a copy of Dreams (1890), a book by Olive Schreiner that has been passed from one suffragette to another. On the day of the Derby, only Maud and Emily attend. They are barred from the area near the King, but Emily decides that they must carry on anyway. While the race is underway, Emily runs onto the track, stepping in front of Anmer, the King's horse, and Maud witnesses her being trampled to death. After returning to London, Maud retrieves Violet's daughter, Maggie, from the laundry, and takes her to the home of Alice Haughton, who agrees that Maggie can work there instead. Maud later joins in Emily's funeral procession. The film ends by stating that Emily's funeral was reported around the world; and that certain women over 30 in the UK were given the right to vote in 1918, rights over their own children in 1925, and the same voting rights as men in 1928. Scrolling text lists countries that preceded Britain in giving women the vote and others that did so later.

Cast
 Carey Mulligan as Maud Watts
 Helena Bonham Carter as Edith Ellyn. Although the character of Ellyn is fictitious, she was loosely based on Edith Garrud and Edith New.
 Meryl Streep as Emmeline Pankhurst
 Natalie Press as Emily Davison
 Anne-Marie Duff as Violet Miller
 Romola Garai as Alice Haughton
 Ben Whishaw as Sonny Watts
 Brendan Gleeson as Arthur Steed
 Samuel West as Benedict Haughton
 Adrian Schiller as David Lloyd George
 Morgan Watkins as Malcolm Walsop
 Lorraine Stanley as Mrs Coleman
 Amanda Lawrence as Miss Withers
 Adam Nagaitis as  Mr Cummins
 Emma Morgano as Miss Plook
Only Pankhurst, Davison, Lloyd George and King George V are not fictitious.

Production

Development
In April 2011, it was announced that Film4 Productions, Focus Features and Ruby Films were developing a history drama film about the British women's suffrage movement of the late 19th and early 20th century. Abi Morgan was set to write the script while Sarah Gavron was attached to direct the film. On 24 October 2013, it was revealed that Pathé had replaced Focus, while the BFI Film Fund was to fund the film and that Ryan Kavanaugh was attached to produce it.

In October 2014, Relativity Media acquired only the North American rights and Pathé acquired the international rights to distribute Suffragette. However, on 17 March 2015, Focus Features took over the North American distribution rights, after the success of The Theory of Everything. The main reason was that Relativity had filed for bankruptcy at the time, so Focus took over the distribution rights in the United States and Ryan dropped out of producing the film due to the bankruptcy of Relativity.

Casting
Carey Mulligan was cast to play the lead role on 24 February 2013; Helena Bonham Carter joined on 20 December 2013; Meryl Streep was cast as British suffragette leader Emmeline Pankhurst on 19 February 2014; Ben Whishaw and Brendan Gleeson joined the cast on 20 February 2014.

Filming
Principal photography began on 24 February 2014 in London. The production also visited The Historic Dockyard Chatham where they filmed the factory and prison scenes.

Release
The film was released in the United Kingdom and Ireland on 12 October 2015 by Pathé, distributed by 20th Century Fox.

Originally, Relativity Media acquired United States distribution rights in October 2014; but eventually left the project following its financial struggles and bankruptcy at the time. In the aftermath of the success of The Theory of Everything, Focus Features later acquired distribution rights to the film in North America instead as well as several other territories, following which Ryan Kavanaugh dropped out of producing the film. Focus Features then set the film for a limited release in the United States on 23 October 2015.

In June 2015, it was announced that Suffragette would receive its European premiere on 7 October 2015 as the opening film of the BFI London Film Festival. The LFF director, Clare Stewart, said Gavron's feature was an "urgent and compelling film, made by British women, about British women who changed the course of history". The film premiered at the Telluride Film Festival on 4 September 2015.

To promote the film before its October 2015 release, Suffragette teamed with the magazine Time Out London to develop a marketing campaign featuring the film's stars. After its publication in September 2015, the resulting material generated controversy among media outlets. Mulligan, Streep, Garai and Duff appeared in a promotional photograph wearing T-shirts emblazoned with a Pankhurst quotation used in the film: "I'd rather be a rebel than a slave". This quickly led to a media furore, with critics describing the magazine's choice of slogan "unfortunate", "tone-deaf", and "racist". Scholar Ana Stevenson noted that while from a historical perspective the usage of the Pankhurst quotation in the film was accurate, "Meryl Streep, Carey Mulligan, Romola Garai and Anne-Marie Duff are rich, privileged, white women who are celebrity movie stars – certainly not slaves"; Stevenson further argued that there is "a perversity in claiming otherwise when racial discrimination and domestic violence remain very present concerns".

The feminist group Sisters Uncut demonstrated at the London premiere against government cuts to domestic violence services. Bonham Carter described the protest as "perfect. If you feel strongly enough about something and there's an injustice there you can speak out and try to get something changed". Carey Mulligan said that the protest was "awesome" and that she was sad she had missed it.

Reception

Box office
, Suffragette had grossed $34 million against a budget of $14 million.

Critical reception
Suffragette has received positive reviews. On Rotten Tomatoes, the film has a rating of 72%, based on 217 reviews, with an average rating of 6.70/10. The website's critical consensus reads, "Suffragette dramatizes an important – and still painfully relevant – fact-based story with more than enough craft and sincerity to overcome its flaws." On Metacritic, the film holds a score of 66 out of 100, based on 37 critics, indicating "generally favourable reviews".

Awards

 British Independent Film Awards, Best Supporting Actor, Brendan Gleeson
 Hamptons International Film Festival, Tangerine Entertainment Juice Award, Sarah Gavron
 Hollywood Film Awards, Actress of the Year, Carey Mulligan
 Mill Valley Film Festival, Audience Award, Mind the Gap, Sarah Gavron

See also
Suffragette bombing and arson campaign
List of suffragette bombings
Shoulder to Shoulder
Iron Jawed Angels (2004 film)
Suffs (2022 musical)
Feminism in the United Kingdom

References

Further reading

External links
 
  Suffragette at Focus Features
  Suffragette Press Kit. Transmission Films, (57 pp), 2015.
 
 
 
 Official screenplay

2015 films
2015 drama films
2010s feminist films
2010s historical drama films
2010s political drama films
British historical drama films
British political drama films
Drama films based on actual events
Films about activists
Women's suffrage in the United Kingdom
Cultural depictions of Emmeline Pankhurst
Cultural depictions of David Lloyd George
Films set in 1912
Films set in the 1900s
Films set in London
Films shot in London
Films produced by Alison Owen
Films scored by Alexandre Desplat
Film4 Productions films
Focus Features films
Pathé films
Films shot at Elstree Film Studios
2010s English-language films
2010s British films